The Hungarian Handballer of the Year award is an annual prize, which is given to the Hungarian handballer who is considered to have performed the best over the previous calendar year.

Presented by the Hungarian Handball Federation since 1964, the most successful handball player is Anita Görbicz, with six nominations.

During the long history of the award, only one handballer playing abroad has received the title, namely László Nagy in 2009, who played for FC Barcelona Handbol at that time.

List of winners

See also
 Hungarian handball clubs in European competitions

References

External links
 List of Hungarian Handballer of the Year winners – Men
  List of Hungarian Handballer of the Year winners – Women

Awards established in 1964
Handball trophies and awards
Handball in Hungary